The 1979 Tour de France was the 66th edition of the Tour de France, one of cycling's Grand Tours. The Tour began in Fleurance with a prologue individual time trial on 27 June, and Stage 12 occurred on 9 July with a flat stage to Metz. The race finished in Paris on 22 July.

Prologue
27 June 1979 – Fleurance to Fleurance,  (ITT)

Stage 1
28 June 1979 – Fleurance to Luchon,

Stage 2
29 June 1979 – Luchon to Superbagnères,  (ITT)

Stage 3
30 June 1979 – Luchon to Pau,

Stage 4
1 July 1979 – Captieux to Bordeaux,  (TTT)

Stage 5
2 July 1979 – Neuville-de-Poitou to Angers,

Stage 6
3 July 1979 – Angers to Saint-Brieuc,

Stage 7
4 July 1979 – Saint-Hilaire-du-Harcouët to Deauville,

Stage 8
5 July 1979 – Deauville to Le Havre,  (TTT)

Stage 9
6 July 1979 – Amiens to Roubaix,

Stage 10
7 July 1979 – Roubaix to Brussels,

Stage 11
8 July 1979 – Brussels to Brussels,  (ITT)

Stage 12
9 July 1979 – Rochefort to Metz,

References

1979 Tour de France
Tour de France stages